The Italian Penal Code of 1889, commonly known as the Zanardelli Code, was the penal code in effect in the Kingdom of Italy from 1890 to 1930, and it is still in effect in Vatican City. The Zanardelli code gets its name from Giuseppe Zanardelli, then Minister of Justice, who lobbied for the code's approval. It unified penal legislation in Italy, abolished capital punishment and recognised the right to strike.

The Report to the King 
In his Report to the King (Italian: Relazione al Re), Zanardelli said he was convinced that "laws must be written in such a way that even uneducated men can understand their meaning; and this is especially the case for a penal code, which concerns a great number of citizens  even among the popular classes, who must be given a way to know, without the need for interpreters, what the code prohibits." Zanardelli believed that criminal law must never forget the rights of man and of the citizen and that it should not consider a criminal to be fundamentally incorrigible. It wasn't enough to simply intimidate and to restrain; it was also necessary to correct and educate.

Features 
The Zanardelli Code came into force on 1 January 1890, though it was unanimously approved by both Chambers of the Parliament of the Kingdom of Italy on 30 June 1889. The code abolished the death penalty (which was still in effect in the main European States) for all crimes, with the exception of certain military crimes committed in times of war. The code also granted a limited right to strike, and it introduced parole, the principle of punishment as rehabilitation, judicial discretion, and certified mental illness as a reason to be exempt from trial.

Replacement and repeal 
When the Mussolini Cabinet came into power in 1922, many of the Zanardelli Code's regulations were effectively ignored. In 1930, the Zanardelli Code was formally replaced by the Rocco Code, named after the then Minister of Justice, Alfredo Rocco.

After the fall of fascism, when Italy became a constitutional republic, there was a tension between restoring the more liberal Zanardelli Code and adapting it to modern times and keeping the Rocco Code, which, despite its authoritarianism, was more scientifically advanced than the Zanardelli Code. Moreover, the Rocco Code abided by the principle of ex post facto. In the end, the Rocco Code remained in effect, with its more authoritarian parts expunged. A new code of criminal procedure was passed in 1988, and the Zanardelli Code was officially repealed in its entirety in December 2010.

Current use 
Although the Zanardelli Code hasn't been in effect in Italy since 1930, it is still the main source for criminal law in Vatican City, which adopted it after the Lateran Treaty of 1929, along with all other Italian legislation in effect at the time. In cases concerning more recent crimes, such as selling Psychoactive drugs, the Vatican has referenced other sources in their legal system and has reformed the code many times over the years.

In addition, the Turkish penal code of 1926, which replaced the 19th-century Ottoman version that was partially modelled on the Napoleonic penal code, was based in part on the Zanardelli Code. A notable exception was its inclusion of the death penalty (which wouldn't be abolished in Turkey until 2004).

References  

Criminal codes
1889 establishments in Italy